Tirou is a Charleroi Metro station, located in downtown Charleroi, in fare zone 1. Tirou is an open-air station located at street level (Rue de l'écluse) and offers same-platform bus transfer.

The station's lateral platform are publicly accessible and serve as regular street sidewalks.

The station and the nearby Tirou Boulevard are named after Joseph Tirou (1876–1952), a former Belgian politician and mayor of Charleroi.

Nearby points of interest 
 Boulevard Joseph Tirou, the main shopping district in the lower town of Charleroi.
 Institut Notre-Dame school.
 FOREM.

Transfers  
TEC Charleroi bus lines 1, 3, 4, 10, 13, 14, 18, 25, 35, 37, 41, 42, 52, 71, 74, 86, E, E/

Charleroi Metro stations
Railway stations opened in 2012